Live and in Living Color is a 1976 live album by Tower of Power and is their last album on Warner Bros. Records.  It features a few of their biggest hits and some gems from their first album East Bay Grease.  David Garibaldi left the band again after this album.

Track listing
"Down to the Nightclub (Bump City)" (David Garibaldi, Emilio Castillo, Steve Kupka) - 2:30
"You're Still a Young Man" (Emilio Castillo, Steve Kupka) - 5:14
"What is Hip?" (David Garibaldi, Emilio Castillo, Steve Kupka) - 6:35
"Sparkling in the Sand" (Emilio Castillo, Lawrence J. Lopez, Steve Kupka) - 8:12
"Knock Yourself Out" (Emilio Castillo, Steve Kupka) - 23:08

Personnel
Tower of Power
 Hubert Tubbs - lead vocals
 Bruce Conte - guitar, co-lead vocals on "Sparkling in the Sand"
 Chester Thompson - organ, keyboards, vocals
 Francis "Rocco" Prestia - bass
 David Garibaldi - drums
 Lenny Pickett - first tenor saxophone, soprano saxophone, alto saxophone, flute
 Emilio Castillo - second tenor saxophone, vocals
 Stephen "Doc" Kupka - baritone saxophone
 Mic Gillette - trumpet, trombone, flugelhorn, piccolo trumpet, bass trombone, vocals
 Greg Adams - trumpet, flugelhorn

References

External links

1976 live albums
Live albums by American artists
Tower of Power albums
Warner Records live albums